Kabudeh (also Romanized as Kabūdeh; also known as Qal‘eh-ye Kabūdeh, and Kaboodan) is a village in Naharjan Rural District, Mud District, Sarbisheh County, South Khorasan Province, Iran. At the 2006 census, its population was 34, in 12 families.

References 

Populated places in Sarbisheh County